Eutrypanus tessellatus is a species of longhorn beetles of the subfamily Lamiinae. It was described by White in 1855, and is known from southeastern Brazil.

References

Beetles described in 1855
Endemic fauna of Brazil
Acanthocinini